South Dagon Township (also South Dagon Myothit) is located in the southeastern part of Yangon, Myanmar. The township comprises 26 wards and three village tracts, and shares borders with North Dagon Township and East Dagon Township in the north, Thingangyun Township in the west across the Pazundaung Creek, the Bago River in the east, and Dagon Seikkan Township in the south. South Dagon is one of the new satellite towns founded in 1989 by the military government.

The township has 31 primary schools, seven middle schools and three high schools. It is home to the University of Culture, Yangon.

References

Townships of Yangon